Marondera Central is a constituency of the National Assembly of Zimbabwe, covering much of Marondera, Mashonaland East Province. It was created in 2008 from territory taken from Marondera East and Marondera West. Its current Member of Parliament is Caston Matewu (Citizens Coalition for Change).

History 
Marondera Central was created for the 2008 Zimbabwean general election, with territory taken from the Marondera East and Marondera West constituencies. In 2008, Iain Kay of the Movement for Democratic Change – Tsvangirai won the constituency. In 2013, Ray Kaukonde of ZANU–PF was elected. After Kaukonde was expelled from Parliament in 2013, the constituency was won by Lawrence Katsiru in a by-election.

Caston Matewu of the MDC Alliance was elected to represent Marondera Central in the 2018 election, winning back the constituency for the opposition. Matewu was recalled in October 2020 by the MDC–T amid factional disputes within the party, but was reelected as MP in a 2022 by-election, representing the newly-formed Citizens Coalition for Change party led by Nelson Chamisa.

Demographics 

Marondera Central has a population of 61,998. Of the total, 28,980 are male and 33,018 are female. In 2013, the constituency had 26,888 registered voters with 65% turnout. The population is well educated, compared to the Zimbabwe average. Much of the constituents work in farming, including seasonal employment on commercial farms.

List of members

Electoral history 
The following electoral data for Marondera Central comes from the Electoral Resource Centre.

See also 

 List of Zimbabwean parliamentary constituencies

References 

2008 establishments in Zimbabwe
Constituencies established in 2008
Marondera
Parliamentary constituencies in Zimbabwe